Jim O'Rourke (born January 18, 1969, Chicago, Illinois) is a Tokyo-based American musician, composer and record producer. He has released albums across varied genres, including singer-songwriter music, post-rock, ambient, noise music, and tape experiments. He was associated with the Chicago experimental and improv scene when he relocated to New York City in 2000. He now resides in Japan. O'Rourke is best known for his numerous solo and collaborative music projects, many of which are entirely instrumental, and for his tenure as a member of Sonic Youth from 1999 to 2005.

Biography

O'Rourke was born on January 18, 1969, in Chicago, Illinois, United States. He is an alumnus of DePaul University.

O'Rourke has collaborated with Thurston Moore, Lee Ranaldo, Kim Gordon, Steve Shelley, Derek Bailey, Mats Gustafsson, Mayo Thompson, Brigitte Fontaine, Loren Mazzacane Connors, Merzbow, Nurse with Wound, Phill Niblock, Fennesz, Organum, Phew, Henry Kaiser, Flying Saucer Attack, and in 2006 mixed Joanna Newsom's album Ys. In 2009, he also mixed several tracks on Newsom's follow up Have One On Me.

He has produced albums by artists such as Sonic Youth, Wilco, Stereolab, Superchunk, Kahimi Karie, Quruli, John Fahey, Smog, Faust, Tony Conrad, The Red Krayola, Bobby Conn, Beth Orton, Joanna Newsom and U.S. Maple. He mixed Wilco's Yankee Hotel Foxtrot album and produced their 2004 album, A Ghost Is Born, for which he won a Grammy Award for "Best Alternative Album". During the recording of Yankee Hotel Foxtrot, O'Rourke collaborated with Wilco member Jeff Tweedy and pre-Wilco Glenn Kotche under the name Loose Fur. Their self-titled debut was released in 2003 with a follow-up in 2006 entitled Born Again in the USA. He also mixed the unfinished recordings that made up a planned third album by the late American singer-songwriter Judee Sill, recorded in 1974 and mixed by O'Rourke for a 2005 release.

O'Rourke was once a member of Illusion of Safety, Gastr Del Sol (with David Grubbs) and Sonic Youth. Beginning in 1999 he played bass guitar, guitar and synthesizer with Sonic Youth, in addition to recording and mixing duties with the group. He withdrew as a full member in late 2005, but continued to play with them in some of their side projects.

In early 1993, O'Rourke formed an avant-rock group with Darin Gray and Dylan Posa called Brise-Glace. The band released one studio album, When in Vanitas..., in 1994. They also released a 7" in the same year titled In Sisters All and Felony/Angels on Installment Plan.

O'Rourke has also released many albums under his own name on a variety of labels, exploring a range of electronic and avant-garde styles. His most well-known works may be his series of releases on Drag City, which focus on more traditional songcraft: Bad Timing (1997), Eureka (1999), Insignificance (2001), The Visitor (2009) and Simple Songs (2015). The titles of the first four albums all refer to films by the British director Nicolas Roeg; the first three by direct reference to film titles, the fourth being titled after a fictional album within Roeg's film The Man Who Fell To Earth.

With music director Takehisa Kosugi, he played for the Merce Cunningham dance company for four years. He was guitarist for the 1999 premiere of Cunningham's ballet Biped with Gavin Bryars in Berkeley, California, 

O'Rourke received a 2001 Foundation for Contemporary Arts Grants to Artists Award.

Since 2013, O'Rourke has used his Steamroom Bandcamp page to release material. Steamroom releases have included reissues of rare or unpublished older material, as well as original newer pieces.

Work in films
 O'Rourke worked as a music consultant for the 2003 film School of Rock, in which he taught the child actors in the movie how to play the songs. He was supposed to have a cameo role in the film as well, but couldn't do it as he was on tour with Sonic Youth.
 The song "Happy Days" was featured in the Harmony Korine film Julien Donkey-Boy.
 He scored the 2002 film Love Liza, directed by Todd Louiso.
 He scored the 2004 video installation "Fireball" and did the sound design on the documentary "Red Orchestra" by Stefan Roloff.
 He has also scored films by Werner Herzog, Olivier Assayas, Shinji Aoyama, Kōji Wakamatsu, Harmony Korine and others.
 His own short films have been part of the 2004 and 2006 Whitney Biennial and the 2005 Rotterdam Film Festival.
 His first three full-length albums for Drag City are named after three successive films by director Nicolas Roeg: Bad Timing: A Sensual Obsession, Eureka, and Insignificance. His fourth Drag City album, The Visitor, is named for an album that appears within Roeg's The Man Who Fell to Earth, recorded by the film's protagonist Thomas Jerome Newton.
 He scored Kōji Wakamatsu's film United Red Army in 2007.
 He scored Kyle Armstrong's 2012 documentary film Magnetic Reconnection (narrated by Will Oldham).
 He scored the 2014 British film The Creeping Garden.
 He produced and played on the soundtrack for Ryusuke Hamaguchi's Drive My Car, composed by his frequent collaborator Eiko Ishibashi.

Drag City discography
 Bad Timing (1997)
 Eureka (1999)
 Halfway to a Threeway EP (1999)
 Insignificance (2001)
 The Visitor (2009)
 Simple Songs (2015)

Partial solo discography
 Some Kind of Pagan (Sound of Pig, 1989)
 It Takes Time To Do Nothing (Audiofile Tapes, 1990)
 Secure on the Loose Rim (Sound of Pig, 1991)
 The Ground Below Above Our Heads (Entenpfuhl, 1991)
 Tamper (Extreme Records, 1991)
 Disengage (Staalplaat, 1992)
 Scend (Divided Records, 1992)
 Remove the Need  (Extreme Records, 1993)
 Rules of Reduction (Metamkine, 1993)
 When in Vanitas... (Skin Graft, 1994)
 Terminal Pharmacy (Tzadik Records, 1995)
 Happy Days (Revenant Records, 1997)
 Bad Timing (Drag City, 1997)
 Eureka (Drag City, 1999)
 Halfway to a Threeway EP (Drag City, 1999)
 Insignificance (Drag City, 2001)
 I'm Happy and I'm Singing and a 1, 2, 3, 4 (Mego, 2001)
 Mizu No Nai Umi (vector7/HEADZ54, 2005)
 Corona / Tokyo Realization (Columbia Music Entertainment, 2006) – Japan only release. Dedicated to Tōru Takemitsu
 The Visitor (Drag City, 2009) – Dedicated to Derek Bailey.
 All Kinds of People ~ Love Burt Bacharach (AWDR, 2010)
 Old News #5 (Mego, 2011)
 Old News #6 (Mego, Aug 2011)
 Old News #7 (Mego, Feb 2012)
 Old News #8 (Mego, Sep 2012)
 Imikuzushi (Black Truffle Records, 2012)
 Old News #9 (Mego, Oct 2012)
 Simple Songs (Drag City, 2015)
 Sleep Like It's Winter (Newhere Music, 2018)
 To Magnetize Money and Catch a Roving Eye (Sonoris, 2019)
 Shutting Down Here (Portraits GRM, 2020)

References

External links
 Jim O'Rourke's Bandcamp page for "Steam Room" Music
 Discogs overview
 Complete discography and filmography up to 2008
 
 
 Jim O'Rourke by Jay Sanders Bomb

1969 births
Living people
Sonic Youth members
American rock bass guitarists
American male bass guitarists
Noise rock musicians
American expatriates in Japan
DePaul University alumni
Grammy Award winners
Hurdy-gurdy players
Tzadik Records artists
Drag City (record label) artists
Rune Grammofon artists
Guitarists from Chicago
American male guitarists
20th-century American guitarists
Free improvisation
American experimental musicians
Boxhead Ensemble members
Wilco members
Gastr del Sol members
Incus Records artists
Domino Recording Company artists
Love Da Records artists